Marienborg is a railway station located at Marienborg in Trondheim, Norway.

Location 
The station is located on the Dovre Line at the point where the Stavne–Leangen Line branches off from the Dovre Line. The station has two platforms, one on each of the railway lines, the one track electrified and the other not. Service to the station is provided though the commuter train service Trønderbanen operated by SJ Norge and regional trains to Røros. It was opened in 1999.

The station is located beside St. Olavs Hospital and beside the NSB yard at Marienborg. The station had a role in the 1921 Nidareid train disaster since one of the trains involved was supposed to wait here but failed to do so.

External links 
 Entry at the Norwegian National Rail Administration

Railway stations on the Dovre Line
Railway stations opened in 1999
Railway stations in Trondheim
1999 establishments in Norway